Zuolong (Zuo's dragon) is a genus of coelurosaur dinosaur which existed in what is now Wucaiwan, Xinjiang Autonomous Region of China during the Late Jurassic period (lower Oxfordian stage). It was found in the Shishugou Formation, Xinjiang, China.

Discovery

The holotype fossil of Zuolong, IVPP V15912, a partial skeleton with skull, was discovered in 2001 in China, in the upper part of the Shishugou Formation of Xinjiang. Zuolong was named by Jonah N. Choiniere, James M. Clark, Catherine A. Forster and Xu Xing in 2010, and the type species is Zuolong salleei. The generic name honours General Zuo Zongtang, who secured Xinjiang for China in the nineteenth century. The specific name honours Hilmar Sallee, whose bequest helped finance the research. The specific age for the holotype specimen is 161.2 to 155.2 million years ago. The holotype is considered by Thomas R. Holtz Jr. to almost certainly be from a juvenile theropod.

Description
The specimen is probably from a juvenile animal, and is quite complete.

Classification
Zuolong is a basal coelurosaurian, possibly the most basal known. In 2019 it was found to be a member of Tyrannoraptora in a polytomy with Tyrannosauroidea and Maniraptoromorpha.

References 

Prehistoric coelurosaurs
Oxfordian life
Late Jurassic dinosaurs of Asia
Jurassic China
Fossils of China
Paleontology in Xinjiang
Fossil taxa described in 2010
Taxa named by Xu Xing
Taxa named by Catherine Forster